Electricity sector in Estonia is connected to Finland, Russia and the other Baltic countries. As of 2016, it was one of the dirtiest in the EU in terms of CO2 emissions, as oil-based fuels accounted for about 80% of domestic production. However, renewables had grown to over 13% of production whereas they were less than 1% in 2000. Thus, Estonia is one of the countries to have reached its EU renewable target by 2016.

Consumption 
According to IEA the electricity use (gross production + imports – exports – transmission/distribution losses) in 2008 in Estonia was 8.5 TWh and population 1.34 million people. Own energy production was 78% of primary energy in 2008. In 2008 electricity use per person in Estonia was 105% compared to the United Kingdom.

Production

Fossil fuels 
Oil-based fuels, including oil shale and fuel oils, accounted for about 80% of domestic production in 2016. There is also some natural gas capacity, but no coal generation.
The largest power complex in the country, Narva Power Plants, consists of the world's two largest oil shale-fired thermal power plants. The complex generated about 95% of total power production in Estonia in 2007.

Wind power 

Total installed wind power was 149 MW at end of 2010 and grew to 303 MW in 2014. In the end of 2010 the installed wind power equaled in average 3.2% of electricity use. The European average was 5.3%. Estonia has target of 14% (1.5 TWh) and total renewable electricity 1.9 TWh (17.6%). According to the national Energy Action Plan (2020) planned shares are onshore 9% and offshore 5%. The state energy company Eesti Energia was interested in offshore wind energy in 2008.

Other renewables 
The rest of Estonia's generation is from other renewable fuels. Wood-based fuels were the second largest source of power in 2016. The rest comes from waste and other biofuels, as well as a small amount of hydropower.

Transmission and trade 
Estonia's grid is an important hub as it is connected to Finland in the north, Russia in the east, Latvia and Lithuania in the south. Electricity is traded on the Nordic power market Nord Pool. In 2014–2016, yearly net imports from Finland were equal to 31-67% of consumption. Meanwhile, yearly new exports to Latvia were equal to 57-84% of consumption. Some years there are also exports to Russia.

Between Estonia and Finland there are the submarine Estlink cables.

See also 

 Energy in Estonia

References 

Electric power in Estonia